The Bekker Nunataks are a group of three nunataks lying below Ruth Ridge on the north side of Drygalski Glacier and the southwest side of Enravota Glacier on Nordenskjöld Coast in Graham Land, Antarctica. They were mapped from surveys by the Falkland Islands Dependencies Survey (1960–61), and named by the UK Antarctic Place-Names Committee for Lieutenant Colonel Mieczysław G. Bekker, Polish-born Canadian engineer, the author of Theory of Land Locomotion, 1956, a comprehensive source of information on the physical relationship between snow mechanics and track-laying vehicles, skis and sledges.

References
 SCAR Composite Antarctic Gazetteer.
 

Nunataks of Graham Land
Nordenskjöld Coast